La Neuveville-sous-Montfort is a commune in the Vosges department in Grand Est in northeastern France.

Geography
Sited on south facing hills that capture the sun, encourages and agricultural economy that includes viticulture, while proximity to a well known spa resort supports the local tourist business:  there are a number of well marked walking trails around the village.

See also
Communes of the Vosges department

References

Communes of Vosges (department)